Colvillea racemosa is a species of legume in the family Fabaceae. It is also known by the common name Colville's Glory.  Its genus is named for Sir Charles Colville, an ex Governor of Mauritius.  The tree is particularly known for its bright orange flowers that grow in large cone or cylinder shaped clusters.  After flowering, the tree produces long, flat, woody seed pods.  The tree has small deep green leaves, superficially similar to Delonix regia.

The tree is native to Madagascar, although it is now widely grown as an ornamental plant in Australia and North America.  In its native range, the tree primarily grows in lowland forest and savannah areas.

The species is listed as "Least Concern" on the IUCN red list.

Gallery

References

Caesalpinioideae
Endemic flora of Madagascar
Taxonomy articles created by Polbot
Taxa named by Wenceslas Bojer
Taxa named by William Jackson Hooker